How to Be is a 2008 independent comedy-drama film written and directed by Oliver Irving.  It is about a young man named Art, played by Robert Pattinson, who is going through a quarter-life crisis. The film premiered in competition at 2008 Slamdance Film Festival on 18 January 2008. The film was also selected to open 2008 Strasbourg International Film Festival and Pattinson received 'Best Actor in a Feature' award for his portrayal of Art at the festival.

Plot
Art (Pattinson) is not talented, but aspires to be a musician. He has a dead-end job at a supermarket, despite having a degree (which he doesn't seem to value much). His girlfriend ends their relationship. Art is then forced to move back home with his cold and neglectful parents (played by Pidgeon and Michael Irving). Art buys a book titled, It's Not Your Fault. Upon reading it, he tries to follow the self-help book's advice. He decides to use inheritance money to first buy a car, and then pay for a Canadian therapist, Dr. Levi Ellington (Jones), the book's author, to come to his home in England and help Art get his life on track, about which his parents are less than thrilled.

Despite his unsupportive parents, Art attempts with his new life coach and two slightly unbalanced friends Nikki (Pearce) and Ronnie (White) to find a balance in his life, true happiness, and a good relationship with his parents.

The film also stars Jeremy Hardy as Art's superior at the care centre at which he volunteers.

Cast
Robert Pattinson as Art
Rebecca Pidgeon as Art's Mother
Jeremy Hardy as Jeremy
Powell Jones as Dr. Ellington
Michael Irving as Art's Father
Johnny White as Ronnie 
Mike Pearce as Nikki
Bart kusse as Child Art

Production
Casting for the film took more than a year. Initially Simon Amstell was attached to the project. Talking about the casting Irving said that "He (Rob) understood what we wanted to achieve, he was musical and had completely the right look. To find all those elements was incredible: the final piece in the puzzle."

For his role of awkward and geeky musician in the film, Pattinson's looks were altered. According to Irving "I said, 'You're banned from cutting your hair between now and the shoot, we had to give him the most awkward haircut we possibly could, and we cut his trouser length a little bit too high. Things like that played down his apparent good looks." And about his musical abilities, Irving added that "He downplayed how good he was, a lot of the time he would turn out to have a really good technique (while playing the guitar and harmonica) and we told him he needed to play it more simply."

Filming took place in early 2007.

Distribution
How to Be was released in the United States by IFC Festival Direct on 29 April 2009.  Leading up to the release, the director, Oliver Irving, took the film on a United States screening tour. The DVD was released first in the United Kingdom on 18 May 2009 and was released in the United States on 17 November 2009.

Music

The score for the film was composed by Joe Hastings and songs for the album was chosen by music supervisor Gary Moore. The album contain 23-tracks, three original songs performed by Robert Pattinson and by musician-actor Johnny White, who plays Ronny in the film. It also features "Old Man" by Love, "Clear Spot" by Captain Beefheart and "Hammond Song" by The Roches. The album was released by Dreamboat Records on 28 April 2009.

Track listing
 Opening Credits - Joe Hastings
 "Chokin' on the Dust" (Part 1) - Robert Pattinson
 "It's not your fault" - Joe Hastings
 "Hell Awaits" - The Rollercoaster Project
 "You don’t actually have things all that bad"
 "Old Man" - Love
 "Chokin' on the Dust" (Part 2) - Robert Pattinson
 "Sometimes we all need a little help" - Joe Hastings
 "Dr Ellington Arrives" - Joe Hastings
 "Visualize a time" - Joe Hastings
 "Jam Session"
 "1996" - The Rollercoaster Project
 "Nikki's Song" - Mike Pearce
 "Puzzle" - Joe Hastings
 "Cemetery" - Joe Hastings
 "Off License" - Joe Hastings
 "Process 1" - The Rollercoaster Project
 "Clear Spot" - Captain Beefheart
 "Hammond Song" - The Roches
 "Final Call" - Joe Hastings
 "You're not a nobody"
 "Doin' Fine" - Robert Pattinson
 End Credits - Joe Hastings

Reception

Critical response
The film received mixed reviews, while Pattinson's performance was praised. Geo Euzebio in her review for Cineplayer criticized the film by saying that it "seems more of the same: A dramedy about characters and dysfunctional families, with humor and structure based on American independent comedy" but ultimately praised Pattinson: "(his) performance is interesting and he hits the pitch with the pseudo-musician who only scratches few chords on the guitar, but still want to live their art."

However Peter Debruge from Variety gave the film a negative review, saying "(it) is a taxing reminder that middle-class depression ranks among cinema's least engaging topics."

Film festivals
How to Be had its world premiere at the 2008 Slamdance Film Festival, where it won the Grand Jury Honorable Mention. It has since been chosen to appear at:

 Rhode Island International Film Festival (5–10 August 2008)
 Strasbourg International Film Festival, where it was the opening night film (12–21 September 2008)
 Calgary International Film Festival (19–28 September 2008)
 Derby City Film Festival (8–12 October 2008)
 New Orleans Film Festival (10–16 October 2008)
 Indie 2008 Film Festival, Brazil (10–16 October 2008)
 Austin Film Festival (16–23 October 2008)
 Gotham Screen New York International Festival (31 October-1 November 2008)
 Lone Star International Film Festival (12–16 November 2008)
 Cinequest Film Festival (28 February-2 March 2009)
 Durango Film Festival (4–8 March 2009)
 George Lindsey UNA Film Festival (5–8 March 2009)
 Chicago International Movie and Music Festival (8 March 2009)
 DC Independent Film Festival (8 March 2009)
 Burbank International Film Festival (27 March 2009)
 Las Vegas International Film Festival (9–12 April 2009)
 California Independent Film Festival (16 April 2009)
 22nd Singapore International Film Festival (25 April 2009)
 First Glance Hollywood Film Festival (1–3 May 2009)

Accolades

References

External links
 
 
 
 Making of Europe Making of Documentary Exceprts

2008 films
2000s coming-of-age comedy-drama films
British coming-of-age comedy-drama films
British independent films
2008 directorial debut films
2008 independent films
2000s English-language films
2000s British films